Mehran Fatemi (born 1978) is an Iranian conservative politician who currently serves as the governor of Yazd Province.

Early life and education
Fatemi was born in Esfandabad in the Yazd province in 1978.He holds a bachelor's degree in Natural Resources Engineering and received a PhD in Meteorology (Climate Hazards) from Yazd university.

References

1978 births
Living people
People from Yazd
Governors of Yazd Province